Gunnar Gunnarson (1918–2002) was a Swedish socialist, marxist historian, writer and publicist. He was a long-serving editor-in-chief at the Swedish Social Democratic publishing house Tidens förlag.

References

External links

1918 births
2002 deaths
Swedish socialists
Marxist historians
Marxist writers
Swedish-language writers
Swedish Marxists